The World Memory Championships is an organized competition of memory sports in which competitors memorize as much information as possible within a given period of time. The championship has taken place annually since 1991, with the exception of 1992. It was originated by Tony Buzan and co founded by Tony Buzan and Ray Keene. It continues to be organized by the World Memory Sports Council (WMSC), which was jointly founded by Tony Buzan and Ray Keene. In 2016, due to a dispute between some players and the WMSC, the International Association of Memory (IAM) was launched. From 2017 onward, both organizations have hosted their own world championships. 

The current WMSC world champion is Tenuun Tamir of Mongolia. The current IAM world champion is Andrea Muzii of Italy.

Format
The World Championships consist of ten different disciplines, where the competitors have to memorize as much as they can in a period of time:
 One hour numbers (23712892....)
 5-minute numbers
 Spoken numbers, read out one per second
 30-minute binary digits (011100110001001....)
 One hour playing cards (as many decks of cards as possible)
 15-minute random lists of words (house, playing, orphan, encyclopedia....)
 15-minute names and faces
 5-minute historic dates (fictional events and historic years)
 15-minute abstract images (WMSC, black and white randomly generated spots) / 5-minute random images (IAM, concrete images)
 Speed cards - Always the last discipline. Memorize the order of one shuffled deck of 52 playing cards as fast as possible.

Venues and winners
World Champions (1991-2016)

IAM  world champions (2017–present)

WMSC world champions (2017–present)

 – The 2016 World Championships was hosted by the WMSC and was the first world championship not recognized by the IAM, who did not host their own world championship that year.

§ – Athletes generally competed in their respective countries given COVID-19 restrictions, with results combined to determine the world champion.

Records 
Up-to-date lists of world and national records can be found on the statistics websites of the IAM and WMSC. The best of them are listed in the following table.

See also 
 World championship
 Eidetic memory
 Grand Master of Memory
 List of world championships in mind sports
 Memory sport
 Method of loci
 Mnemonist
 Mnemonic major system
 Extreme Memory Tournament
 World Junior Memory Championships
 World Mind Sports Games
 Mind Sports Olympiad
 Memory sport
 Mind sport
 Mind Sports Organisation
 International Association of Memory
 Mental Calculation World Cup
 Mental calculation
 Mental abacus
 WorldSkills

References

External links 
 World Memory Championships website
 WMSC Statistics website
 IAM website
 IAM Statistics website
 Memoriad - World Memory Olympics website
 List of Memory Competitions
 RNG v1.0 Random Number Generator for training Working Memory

Memory games
Competitions
Memory
Recurring sporting events established in 1991